Wuhua County Olympic Sports Centre, formerly known as the Wuhua County Football Culture Park, is a sports complex located in Wuhua County, Meizhou, Guangdong, China. The complex consists of a football stadium named Huitang Stadium, gymnasium, futsal field, a seven-a-side football field, tennis courts and swimming and diving complex.

The complex is planned to be built in two phases. The first phase is estimated to cost ¥257 million for the football stadium. The stadium is named Huitang Stadium after Wuhua-based footballer Lee Wai Tong. It broke ground in March 2016, and was expected to open in March 2018, but the formal opening was delayed until 1 January 2019 as part of the opening ceremony for the 2019 Hakka Cup. It is the home stadium of Chinese Super League club Meizhou Hakka.

References

Sports complexes in China
Football venues in China
Athletics (track and field) venues in China
Sports venues in Guangdong
Multi-purpose stadiums in China
Sports venues completed in 2018